The Del Rio News-Herald was a newspaper published in Del Rio, Texas, covering Val Verde County. The publication's  origins date back to 1884, but the paper took on its current name after a consolidation of two separate titles in 1929. It was owned by Southern Newspapers Inc. and published Tuesday through Friday afternoons and on Sunday morning. Its final issue was published on November 18, 2020. At the time, the newspaper had a daily circulation of 10,400 and a Sunday circulation of 13,500 newspapers. The chief reporter for the paper was Karen Gleason.

References

External links
 Del Rio News-Herald
 Southern Newspapers
 Photograph of building, c. 1976

1884 establishments in Texas
2020 disestablishments in Texas
Del Rio News-Herald
Del Rio, Texas
Newspapers established in 1884
Publications disestablished in 2020